Luzgin is a Russian masculine surname originating from the nickname Luzga or Luska, meaning one eyed man; its feminine counterpart is Luzgina. 

It may refer to:
Anatoly Luzgin (born 1931), Russian rowing coxswain 
Andrei Luzgin (born 1973), Estonian tennis player and coach

References
 Ganzhina, I. M. (2001) Словарь современных русских фамилий. Moscow: Astrel. 

Russian-language surnames